HaraHara Mahadeva is a Kannada mythological television series based on legends of Lord Shiva, also known as Mahadeva. It is airing on the newly named Star Suvarna channel from 25 July 2016. Star Suvarna, the 4th largest Kannada channel in India, is funding this serial with the largest regional market budget of Rs.60 crore (over US$9 million Aug 2017). It is remake of Hindi serial Devon Ke Dev...Mahadev and dubbed in Telugu and Tamil languages. It has several nominations for the Suvarna Film Awards. Ajay Devgan said it was a "visual treat" and had many untold stories of Lord Mahadeva. This big budget serial is based on the work by Devdutt Pattanaik. It has aired over 300 episodes and Karthik Parak, head of regional branch programming at Star Suvarna plans to extend it to 500 episodes.

Crew
 Nikhil Sinha, producer
 Deepak Garg, show director and cinematography
 Nitin Gopi, episode director
 Shivaraj Madhugiri, episode director
 Srinivas Prasad, episode director
 Utkarsh Naithani, writer
 Mihir Bhuta, writer

Cast
 Vinay Gowda as Shiva  Mahadeva  Kalabhairava  Veerabhadra  Jalandhara
 Priyanka Chincholi as Parvati Adi Shakti Durga Bhadrakali
Sangeetha as Sati Dakshayani
 Pallavi Purohit as Lakshmi
 Aryan Raj as Vishnu
 Rajesh Rao as Brahma
 Soori Sarga as Indra
 Neha Saxena as Madanike
 Siddaraj Kalyanakar as Maharshi Dadhichi
 Arun Murthy as Maharshi Kashyapa
 Surya Praveen as Veeravantha
 Karthik Samag as Chandra
 Avit Shetty as Varuna
 Vinayak Desai as Vasuki
 Vishal Hegde as Nandi
 Veena Ponnappa as Prasuti
 Bullet Sreenu as Chakri
 Arjun Nagarakar as Agni
 Purvi Joshi as Ganga
 Keerthi Baanu as Daksha Prajapati
 Pavan Madhukar as Karthikeya
 Rohit Nagesh as King Himavat

References

External links
Hara Hara Mahadeva full episodes online for free on hotstar.com

Kannada-language television shows
Indian drama television series
Indian television soap operas
2016 Indian television series debuts
Indian television series about Hindu deities
Star Suvarna original programming